HSC Our Lady Pamela was a high-speed catamaran ferry which operated between the Isle of Wight and mainland England. She had operated on the Wightlink Ryde Pier to Portsmouth route since 1986 under Sealink along with her now scrapped sister ship HSC Our Lady Patricia. Both ships were named after the daughters of Lord Mountbatten, who had been the Governor of the Isle of Wight.

In March 2009, it was announced that Wightlink would be replacing its FastCat catamarans with two new vessels, Wight Ryder I and Wight Ryder II. Our Lady Pamela was, however, taken out of service earlier than the two other vessels, FastCat Ryde and FastCat Shanklin. This was partly due to an engine fire causing significant damage. 

She was scrapped at Esbjerg in April 2010.

References

Ferries of England
Ferry transport on the Isle of Wight
1986 ships
Individual catamarans
Ships built by Incat